This Passionate Land is a 1979 romantic novel written by Hal Bennett, under the pen name of Harriet Janeway.

References

1979 American novels
American romance novels
Works published under a pseudonym
Novels by Hal Bennett
Signet Books books